Voděrady is a municipality and village in Ústí nad Orlicí District in the Pardubice Region of the Czech Republic. It has about 300 inhabitants.

Administrative parts
The village of Džbánov is an administrative part of Voděrady.

References

Villages in Ústí nad Orlicí District